Equality Matters was a media and communications initiative in support of LGBT rights in the United States. Equality Matters was a partner organization with Media Matters for America, a progressive media watchdog group. Richard Socarides, a longtime LGBT rights activist and former senior advisor to President Bill Clinton on gay civil rights issues, served as the founding president of Equality Matters, and Kerry Eleveld, journalist for The Advocate, served as editor beginning in 2011. Both announced their departure from the organization in November 2011.

History
The organization, an offshoot of Media Matters for America, was founded as a "communications war room for gay equality," and was launched on December 23, 2010. While Media Matters focuses broadly to "notify activists, journalists, pundits, and the general public about instances of misinformation," Equality Matters looked solely at LGBT issues in the media.

Since the departure of Richard Socarides and Kerry Eleveld in November 2011, Equality Matters remained active as a mirror site for Media Matters' LGBT content, with a separate Equality Matters blog and podcast (since March 29, 2011) authored by Bradley Herring and Carlos Maza.

Organization
Equality Matters was an internet-based organization. Their official website featured coverage of LGBT issues in the media. The website featured a blog, a fact checking section, videos, and "Top Picks of the Week", which the organization stated was "Our picks for the most interesting, outrageous, or thought provoking stories of the week."

Association with Media Matters for America
According to David Brock, founder of Media Matters for America,Equality Matters will build on the work done by [Media Matters and Media Matters Action Network]. Through strategic communication, research, training and media monitoring, Equality Matters will strengthen efforts for full LGBT rights and correct anti-gay misinformation. Its goal is to enhance advocacy and activism across all platforms and to leverage expertise in support of others who are working to make full equality a national imperative.

Goals
According to Media Matters founder David Brock, Equality Matters should "expose right-wing bigotry and homophobia wherever we find it" and "stiffen the spines of progressives."  David Mixner, gay author and activist, said of the group that "while a range of groups are working to advance gay rights, the movement has lacked a national rapid-response war room of the sort that can push back against homophobic messages in the media and the political arena and keep the pressure on elected officials."

Public reception
In the months following its December 2010 launch, Equality Matters faced some criticism about the way the organization was being run. Peter Rosenstein of the Washington Blade stated that he believed "Over the past couple of months it appears that Equality Matters may have been launched too soon and before its organizers had a real strategy and mission for what they would do."

See also
Human Rights Campaign
GLAAD
Black Gay Men's Advisory Group

References

External links
 

Media analysis organizations and websites
LGBT political advocacy groups in the United States
Non-profit organizations based in Washington, D.C.